Kagoule are an alternative rock band from Nottingham, UK. Formed when the members were in their teens, the line-up consists of Cai Burns (vocals, guitar), Lucy Hatter (bass, vocals) and Lawrence English (drums). They have released two albums, Urth (2015) on Earache Records and Strange Entertainment (2018) on Alcopop! Records. Their sound has been described as being heavily influenced by indie and grunge bands from the 1990s such as Pixies and The Smashing Pumpkins, as well as hardcore punk bands such as Fugazi.

Formation, early years and Urth 

The band was formed when the members were in their early teens and initially worked with local label Denizen Recordings. In 2014, they appeared on the BBC Introducing stage at Glastonbury. They put out several singles before their debut album Urth was released in 2015 on Earache Records, best known for extreme metal bands such as Napalm Death and Bolt Thrower. The album was well-received by the alternative music press, being described by The Quietus as "an exciting debut album that thrills from beginning to end" and by Louder Than War as "a gorgeous, big bastard brick-shit-house of a record".

Strange Entertainment 

In 2018, the band released their second album Strange Entertainment, preceded by the single "Egg Hunt"/"Bad Saliva". Strange Entertainment was again well-received by the independent music press. The Line of Best Fit called it "an enthralling and powerful release". In November 2018, the band embarked on a headline UK tour in support of the album.

Discography

Albums 

Urth (2015), Earache Records
Strange Entertainment (2018), Alcopop! Records

Singles 

"Monarchy"/"Mudhole" (2012), Denizen Recordings
"It Knows It"/"Adjust The Way" (2014), Earache Records
"Glue"/"Made Of Concrete" (2015), Earache Records
"The Bastard" (2015), Earache Records
"Egg Hunt"/"Bad Saliva" (2018) Alcopop! Records

References 

English alternative rock groups
Musical groups from Nottingham